Gwen Stefani is an American singer. She is a member of the rock band No Doubt, whose 1995 album Tragic Kingdom propelled them to stardom and sold 17 million copies worldwide. Before her solo debut, Stefani collaborated with other artists on their albums, including "South Side" with Moby and "Let Me Blow Ya Mind" with Eve and received a Grammy for best rap. Stefani has released three solo studio albums, with Interscope Records: Love. Angel. Music. Baby. (2004), The Sweet Escape (2006) and  This is what the truth feels like (2016) . After the success of her first album, Stefani commented, "All I wanted to do was make a dance record. [...] Not even that — a stupid dance record." Several of her songs have appeared on the Billboard Hot 100 charts, including "Hollaback Girl" which peaked at number one and "The Sweet Escape" at number two.

Stefani's only Grammy Award as a solo artist is the award for Best Rap/Sung Collaboration for the song "Let Me Blow Ya Mind" in 2002. She won two MTV Video Music Awards in 2005, including Best Choreography for "Hollaback Girl" and Best Art Direction for "What You Waiting For?" At the Teen Choice Awards, Stefani won all four nominations that she received, including Choice Breakout, Best Female Video, and Choice Collaboration for "Rich Girl". Also, she was named the World's Best New Female Artist at the World Music Awards in 2005. Overall, Stefani has received 49 awards from 126 nominations.

Academy of Country Music Awards
The Academy of Country Music Awardss is an annual awards ceremony created by the Academy of Country Music in 1966. Stefani has received one nomination.

|-
| 2021
| "Nobody but You" (with Blake Shelton)
| Music Event of the Year
|

American Music Awards
The American Music Awards is an annual awards ceremony created by Dick Clark in 1973. Stefani has received one award from two nominations.

|-
|rowspan="2"|  ||rowspan="2"| Gwen Stefani || Favorite Pop/Rock Female Artist || 
|-
| Artist of the Year || 
|-
|rowspan="1"|  ||rowspan="1"| "Nobody but You" (with Blake Shelton)|| Favorite Song - Country ||

ASCAP Pop Music Awards

|-
| rowspan=2| 2006 
| "Hollaback Girl"
| rowspan=2| Most Performed Songs
| 
|-
| "Rich Girl"
| 
|-
| 2007 
| "Cool"
| Most Performed Songs
| 
|-
| rowspan=2| 2008 
| rowspan=2| "The Sweet Escape"
| Most Performed Songs
| 
|-
| Song of the Year
|

BMI Music Awards

|-
| style="text-align:center;" rowspan="2"|2006
| rowspan="1"|"Hollaback Girl"
| Pop Songs
| 
|-
| "Rich Girl"
| Pop Songs
| 
|-
| style="text-align:center;" rowspan="1"|2007
| rowspan="1"|"Cool"
| Pop Songs
| 
|-
| style="text-align:center;" rowspan="1"|2008
| rowspan="1"|"The Sweet Escape"
| Pop Songs
| 
|-

Billboard Music Awards

|-
|rowspan="3"| 2005 ||rowspan="2"| "Hollaback Girl"  || Digital Song of the Year   || 
|-
|  Hot 100 Song of the Year || 
|-
| Gwen Stefani
| New Artist of the Year ||

Bravo A-List Awards

|-
| style="text-align:center;" rowspan="2"|2009
| rowspan="2"|Gwen Stefani
| Style Female
| 
|-
| Celebrity Designer
| 
|-

BRIT Awards
The BRIT Awards are the British Phonographic Industry's annual pop music awards. Gwen Stefani has won one award from one nominations.

|-
| 2005
| Gwen Stefani
| International Female Solo Artist
|

California Music Awards

|-
|rowspan="1"| 1998 ||rowspan="3"| Gwen Stefani || Outstanding Female Vocalist || 
|-
|rowspan="1"| 2003 || Outstanding Female Vocalist || 
|-
|rowspan="1"| 2004 || Outstanding Female Vocalist ||

CMT Music Awards

|-
|rowspan="1"| 2020 
| "Nobody but You" (with Blake Shelton) 
| Collaborative Video of the Year 
| 
|-

D&AD Awards
Design and Art Direction (D&AD) is a British educational charity which exists to promote excellence in design and advertising. 

|-
| 2006
| "Cool"
| Cinematography
| style="background:#BF8040"| Wood Pencil

ECHO Music Awards

|-
| 2006
| Gwen Stefani
| International Pop/Rock Female Artist of the Year 
|

Glamour Women of the Year Awards

|-
| 2005
| Gwen Stefani
| Best Solo Artist
| 
|-
| 2016
| Gwen Stefani
| The Icon
|

Grammy Awards
The Grammy Awards are awarded annually by the National Academy of Recording Arts and Sciences of the United States. Stefani has won 3 awards from 18 nominations, both as a solo artist and member of No Doubt. Every award is individually assigned to each member of the group.

|-
| style="text-align:center;" rowspan="2" |1997
|Tragic Kingdom
|Best Rock Album
|
|-
|No Doubt
|Best New Artist
|
|-
| style="text-align:center;" rowspan="2"|1998
| rowspan="2"|"Don't Speak"
|Best Pop Performance by a Duo or Group with Vocals
|
|-
|Song of the Year
|
|-
|align=center|2001
|Return of Saturn
|Best Rock Album
|
|-
| style="text-align:center;"| 2002 || "Let Me Blow Ya Mind" (with Eve) || Best Rap/Sung Collaboration || 
|-
| style="text-align:center;" rowspan="3"|2003
|"Hey Baby"
|Best Pop Performance by a Duo or Group with Vocals
|
|-
|Rock Steady
|Best Pop Vocal Album
|
|-
|"Hella Good"
|Best Dance Recording
|
|-
| style="text-align:center;"|2004
|"Underneath It All"
| rowspan="2"|Best Pop Performance by a Duo or Group with Vocals
|
|-
|align=center rowspan="2"|2005
|"It's My Life"
|
|-
| "What You Waiting For?" || Best Female Pop Vocal Performance || 
|-
| style="text-align:center;" rowspan="5"| 2006 ||style="text-align:left;" rowspan="2"|"Hollaback Girl" || Record of the Year || 
|-
| Best Female Pop Vocal Performance || 
|-
|style="text-align:left;" rowspan="2"|Love. Angel. Music. Baby. || Album of the Year || 
|-
|| Best Pop Vocal Album || 
|-
|| "Rich Girl" (with Eve) || Best Rap/Sung Collaboration || 
|-
| style="text-align:center;"| 2008 || "The Sweet Escape" (with Akon) || Best Pop Collaboration with Vocals || 
|-

Hungarian Music Awards
The Hungarian Music Awards (Golden Giraffe Awards, before 2004) is an annual award ceremony held by the Hungarian music industry association Mahasz since 1992.

|-
| 2006
| Love. Angel. Music. Baby.
| International Pop-Rock Album of the Year
|

IFPI Platinum Europe Awards

|-
| 2005 IFPI Platinum Europe Awards|2005
| Love. Angel. Music. Baby.
| Album Title
|

Ibiza Music Video Festival

|-
| rowspan="2" | 2016
| rowspan="2" | "Misery"
| Best Hair & Make Up 
| 
|-
| Best DOP
|

iHeartRadio Music Awards

|-
|2021
| “Nobody but You” (with Blake Shelton)
| Country Song of the Year
|

International Dance Music Awards

|-
|rowspan="1"|  ||rowspan="1"| "What You Waiting For?" || Best Alternative/Rock Dance Artist || 
|-
|rowspan="1"|  ||rowspan="1"| Gwen Stefani || Best Dance Solo Artist ||

JUNO Awards

|-
| 2006
| Love. Angel. Music. Baby.
| International Album of the Year
|

Meteor Ireland Music Awards

|-
| 2006
| Gwen Stefani
| Best International Female
|

MTV Awards

MTV Video Music Award
The MTV Video Music Awards is an annual awards ceremony established in 1984 by MTV. Stefani has received four awards from twelve nominations.

|-
|rowspan="4"|  || "South Side" || Best Male Video || 
|-
|rowspan="3"| "Let Me Blow Ya Mind" || Best Female Video || 
|-
| Best Hip-Hop Video || 
|-
| Viewer's Choice || 
|-
|rowspan="6"|  ||rowspan="4"| "Hollaback Girl"  || Best Choreography  || 
|-
| Video of the Year || 
|-
|  Best Female Video || 
|-
| Best Pop Video || 
|-
|rowspan="2"| "What You Waiting For?" || Best Art Direction || 
|-
|  Best Editing || 
|-
|  || "The Sweet Escape" || Most Earthshattering Collaboration || .

MTV Asia Awards
MTV Asia Awards was another annual award by MTV which were awarded from 2002 to 2008.

|-
|rowspan="1"| 2008 || Gwen Stefani ||  Innovation Award ||

MTV Europe Music Awards

|-
|rowspan="4"| 2005 ||rowspan="1"| Love. Angel. Music. Baby || Album of the Year  || 
|-
|rowspan="2"| "Gwen Stefani" ||  Best Female  || 
|-
| Best Pop ||
|-
| "What You Waiting For?" || Best Video ||

MTV Video Music Japan Awards

|-
|rowspan="1"| 2005 ||rowspan="1"| "What You Waiting For?" || Best Pop Video || 
|-
|rowspan="1"| 2006 ||rowspan="1"| "Hollaback Girl" || Best Pop Video || 
|-
|rowspan="1"|  2007 ||rowspan="1"| "Wind It Up" || Best Female Video ||

MTV TRL Awards

|-
|rowspan="2"| 2005 ||rowspan="1"| Gwen Stefani || TRL's 1st Lady Award || 
|-
|rowspan="1"| "What You Waiting For" || Best Performance ||

MTV Video Music Latino America Awards

|-
|rowspan="2"| 2005 ||rowspan="3"| Gwen Stefani || Best New International Artist || 
|-
| Best Pop International Artist || 
|-
|rowspan="1"| 2007 || Best Pop International ||

MTV Australia Music Awards

|-
|rowspan="4"| 2005 ||rowspan="2"| Gwen Stefani ||  Best Female  || 
|-
| Best Dressed ||
|-
|rowspan="2"| "What You Waiting For" || Video of the Year  ||
|-
| Best Pop Video ||
|-
|rowspan="2"| 2007 ||rowspan="2"| "Wind It Up" ||  Best Female  || 
|-
| Best Pop Video ||

Much Music Video Awards

|-
|rowspan="2"| 2005 ||rowspan="1"| "Rich Girl" || People's Choice: Favourite International Artist || 
|-
|rowspan="1"| "What You Waiting For?" || Best International Video – Artist || 
|-
|rowspan="2"|  ||rowspan="2"| "The Sweet Escape" || Best International Video - Artist || 
|-
| People's Choice: Favourite International Artist || 
|-
|rowspan="1"| 2015 ||rowspan="1"| "Spark the Fire" || Funniest Video of the Year || 
|-

My VH1 Music Awards

|-
|rowspan="6"| 2001 ||rowspan="1"| "What's Going On" || There's No "I" in Team (Best Collaboration) || 
|-
|rowspan="2"| Gwen Stefani || Female Singer || 
|-
| Navel Academy || 
|-
|"Let Me Blow Ya Mind" ||There's No "I" In Team (Best Collaboration) || 
|-
|rowspan="2"|"South Side" || There's No "I" In Team (Best Collaboration) || 
|-
| My Favorite Video || 
|-

Nickelodeon Kids' Choice Awards

|-
| 2006
| "Hollaback Girl"
| Favorite Song
|

NME Awards

|-
| 2005
| Gwen Stefani
| Sexiest Female
|

NRJ Music Awards

|-
| 2005
| Gwen Stefani
| Best International Female
|

One Show Awards

!Ref.
|-
| 2017
| "Make Me Like You"
| Best Music Video
| 
|

People Choice Awards

|-
|rowspan="1"| 2006 ||rowspan="3"| Herself || Favorite Female Singer || 
|-
|rowspan="1"| 2008 || Favorite Female Singer || 
|-
|2019 
| Favorite Fashion Icon of the Year 
|  
|-
|}

People Magazine Awards

|-
|rowspan="1"| 2014 ||rowspan="1"| Gwen Stefani || Style Icon of the Year || 
|-

Premios OYE! Awards

|-
| 2005
| Gwen Stefani
| International Newcomer
|

Q Awards

|-
| 2005
| "What You Waiting For?"
| Best Video
|

Radio Music Awards

|-
| style="text-align:center;"| 2005
| Gwen Stefani
| Artist of the Year/ Mainstream Hit Radio 
|

Radio Disney Music Awards

|-
| style="text-align:center;"| 2016
| Gwen Stefani
| Hero Award
|

Smash Hits Poll Awards

|-
|rowspan="6"| 2005 ||rowspan="2"| "Hollaback Girl" || Best Video || 
|-
| Best Single || 
|-
|rowspan="3"| Gwen Stefani || Best Solo Artist || 
|-
| Smash Hits Stars Of The Year || 
|-
| Sh! Style Icon || 
|-
|rowspan="1"| Love. Angel. Music. Baby. || Best Album ||

Soul Train Music Awards

|-
|rowspan="2"| 2006 ||rowspan="2"| "Hollaback Girl" || Best R&B/Soul Single, Female || 
|-
| Best R&B/Soul or Rap Dance Cut ||

Teen Choice Awards
The Teen Choice Awards is an awards show presented annually by the Fox Broadcasting Company. Stefani has received four awards from fourteen nominations.

|-
| 2001 || "Let Me Blow Ya Mind" || Choice R&B/Hip Hop Track || 
|-
|rowspan="7"| 2005 ||rowspan="4"| "Rich Girl" || Choice Breakout || 
|-
| Best Female Video || 
|-
| Visionary Award  || 
|-
| Choice Collaboration || 
|-
|rowspan="2"| Hollaback Girl|| Choice Single || 
|-
| Choice Summer Song || 
|-
|rowspan="1"| Love. Angel. Music. Baby.|| Choice Album || 
|-
|rowspan="2"| 2007 ||rowspan="1"| "The Sweet Escape" || Choice: Single || 
|-
| Gwen Stefani || Choice: Female || 
|-
| 2009 || Zuma || Choice Celebrity Baby || 
|-
| 2010 || L.A.M.B || Choice Fashion Line || 
|-
|rowspan="2"|2016 || Gwen Stefani || Choice Summer Music Star: Female || 
|-
| "Go Ahead and Break My Heart" || Choice Country Song ||

VH1 Vogue Fashion Awards

|-
|rowspan="2"| 2001 ||rowspan="1"| "South Side" || Visionary Video || 
|-
|Gwen Stefani || Rock Style || 
|-

Vibe Awards

|-
|rowspan="2"| 2005 ||rowspan="1"| "Can I Have It Like That" || Club Banger || 
|-
|rowspan="1"| "Hollaback Girl" || Hottest Hook ||

World Music Awards
The World Music Awards honors recording artists based on worldwide sales figures provided by the International Federation of the Phonographic Industry.

|-
| 2005
| rowspan=3| Gwen Stefani
| Best-selling New Female Artist
| 
|-
| 2005
| Best-Selling Pop Rock Artist
| 
|-
| 2006
| Best-Selling Pop Rock Artist
|

Žebřík Music Awards

!Ref.
|-
| 1997
| rowspan=7|Gwen Stefani
| rowspan=3|Best International Female
| 
| rowspan=2|
|-
| 2003
| 
|-
| rowspan=2|2004
| 
| rowspan=8|
|-
| rowspan=2|Best International Surprise
| 
|-
| rowspan=4|2005
| 
|-
| Best International Female
| 
|-
| Best International Personality
| 
|-
| "What You Waiting For?"
| Best International Video
| 
|-
| 2006
| rowspan=2|Gwen Stefani
| rowspan=2|Best International Female
| 
|-
| 2007
|

See also 
List of awards and nominations received by No Doubt

References

External links
 Gwen Stefani official website

Stefani, Gwen
Awards and nominations